Tungsten is a Swedish power metal band formed by ex-HammerFall drummer Anders Johansson and his two sons.

History 
Anders founded the band in 2016, together with his son Nick and Karl Johansson. The idea for creating a band together arose, after Anders listened to metal music that his sons created, which he enjoyed, eventually leading into the bands formation. Tungsten was later joined by Swedish vocalist Mike Andersson, following which the recording of their first album started.

Their debut album, We Will Rise, was released on 20 September 2019, containing elements of power and folk metal. Rock Hard Germany described the album as "carrying Nordic Folk Metal and predominant Power Metal elements, as well as influences like Rammstein or Modern Metal." The recording of the album and also its producing and mixing, done by Nick Johansson, took place in the summer of 2018. In spring of 2019, a contract with record label Arising Empire was signed, under which the album was later published. The album contains songs titled "We Will Rise" and "The Fairies Dance", which were both published as singles before the album's release, as well as a song called "Misled", which was released on the same day as the album. All three songs were released as music videos.

In summer 2020, Tungsten was supposed to partake in the metal festival Sabaton Open Air as a supporting performer. However, due to the COVID-19 pandemic, the festival was postponed – at first to August 2021, and later to August 2022.

In 2020, the band released three more singles, titled "King of Shadows", "Life of the Ocean" and "Tundra", all of which were released as music videos. Later that year, on November the 27th, their second studio album called Tundra was published. The albums recording started in late 2019, with final vocals being completed by January 2020. The lyrics of the album tell the story of Volfram, the Guardian of time - who can be seen on the cover of the album - and his adventure through an icy tundra. A guest appearance on Tundra was made by Jens Johansson, Anders's brother, who is knows as the keyboardist of bands such as Rainbow and Stratovarius. He can be heard performing a keyboard solo on the albums closing track, "Here Comes the Fall".

On July 7, 2021, the bands official Instagram account confirmed that a third album was in production. Two new singles were released, "Come This Way" on January 28 and "March Along" on March 3, highlighting the release of their new album Bliss, which came out on June 17, 2022.

Members 
Current members
 Mike Andersson – lead vocals
 Karl Johansson – bass, keyboards, unclean vocals
 Nick Johansson – guitar
 Anders Johansson – drums

Timeline

Discography

Studio albums 
 We Will Rise (2019)
 Tundra (2020)
 Bliss (2022)

Singles 
 "We Will Rise" (2019)
 "The Fairies Dance" (2019)
 "Misled" (2019)
 "King of Shadows" (2020)
 "Life and the Ocean" (2020)
 "Tundra" (2020)
 "Come This Way" (2022)
 "March Along" (2022)
 "Bliss" (2022)
 "On The Sea" (2022)

Music videos 
 "We Will Rise" (2019)
 "The Fairies Dance" (2019)
 "Misled" (2019)
 "King of Shadows" (2020)
 "Life and the Ocean" (2020)
 "Tundra" (2020)
 "Come This Way" (2022)
 "March Along" (2022)

References

External links 
 
 Tungsten at Arising Empire

2016 establishments in Sweden
Musical groups established in 2016
Musical quartets
Swedish power metal musical groups
Arising Empire artists